Yangdong may refer to:

Yangdong District, in Guangdong, China
Yangdong Folk Village, in Gangdong-myeon, South Korea